Robert Paus Platt OBE (born 1905 in England, died 22 July 1946 in Jerusalem) was a British diplomat. He served as an under-secretary in the mandatory government of the British Mandate of Palestine and was among the 91 victims of the King David Hotel bombing.

Career

Platt studied at Queens' College, Cambridge and joined the Colonial Administrative Service. He was appointed Assistant Resident Commissioner in Mombasa in 1928. He later became under-secretary in the mandatory government of the British Mandate of Palestine and was killed in the King David Hotel bombing.

Background

Platt was the son of Robert M. Platt and Ellen Sophie Paus. His maternal grandfather Christopher Paus, who was a first cousin of Henrik Ibsen, was a Norwegian-born businessman who moved to England. His other three grandparents were English. He was a nephew of the British Consul in Oslo, Christopher Lintrup Paus.

He was married to Joan Rosa Lumley, a daughter of James Maddy Lumley, a British colonial administrator in Africa who was Commissioner of Police in Kenya.

Honours
Officer of the Order of the British Empire (OBE)

References

British diplomats
Colonial Administrative Service officers
Officers of the Order of the British Empire
British terrorism victims
Terrorism deaths in Jerusalem
British people of Norwegian descent
Alumni of Queens' College, Cambridge
1905 births
1946 deaths
20th century in Jerusalem
British expatriates in Mandatory Palestine